Iosif Fabian (10 August 1923 – 6 July 2008) was a Romanian football striker and coach.

Career
Born in Cluj, Romania, Fabian started his youth career at Muncitorii Cluj. Then he went to play in the neighborhood country Hungary for a few years starting there his senior career. He returned to Romania, at Ferar Cluj for a short period before joining Carmen București. He made his Liga I debut on 25 August 1946 in a match against Jiul Petroşani winning 3–1 and scoring once. During that season he scored 13 goals in 13 matches, and puts his team on the second place in the 1946–47 league table. The same year he leaves Romania, and goes abroad to Italy and signs for AC Torino in the Serie A, where he met up with the legendary Valentino Mazzola, in his first season on the club Josef won the Italian League contributing with 9 goals in 15 appearances, and was the only foreigner on the team. Over the years spent in Italy, he also played for Lucchese and Bari.

In 1951 he leaves Italy, and goes to France and signs for two seasons with AS Cannes, during the 1951–52 season he was loaned out to Roubaix-Tourcoing. During his time in France Spanish side Atlético Madrid put an eye on him and wanted to transfer him to Spain.

After his time in France, he went to Portugal in 1953, and signed for Sporting CP he made there only 6 appearances and scored two goals but won the Portuguese Liga in 1954. Fabian saw his name linked to several clubs and more in the various echelons of Portuguese football but choose instead Barreirense, he was a player-coach there.

After retiring, he started a long career coaching various teams in Portugal and Mozambique. His last training job was at Imortal de Albufeira in the 1983–84 season

National team
Fabian made his debut for the national side led by coach Virgil Economu, on 8 October 1946, in a match against Bulgaria ended 2–2, his only goal for Romania was in a 2–1 victory over Yugoslavia in the Balkan Cup on 11 October 1946.

Honours

Club
Torino
 Serie A: 1947–48

Sporting CP
 Portuguese Liga: 1953–54
 Cup of Portugal: 1953–54

References

1923 births
2008 deaths
Romanian footballers
Romania international footballers
Serie A players
Serie B players
FC Carmen București players
Torino F.C. players
S.S.D. Lucchese 1905 players
S.S.C. Bari players
AS Cannes players
Sporting CP footballers
Association football forwards
Romanian expatriate footballers
Romanian expatriate football managers
Sportspeople from Cluj-Napoca
Expatriate footballers in Italy
Expatriate footballers in France
Expatriate footballers in Portugal
Romanian expatriate sportspeople in Italy
Romanian expatriate sportspeople in France
Romanian expatriate sportspeople in Portugal
Primeira Liga players
Romanian football managers
S.C. Olhanense managers
S.C. Covilhã players
Expatriate football managers in Portugal
Romanian expatriate sportspeople in Mozambique
Expatriate football managers in Mozambique
S.C. Covilhã managers
CO Roubaix-Tourcoing players